A U-bolt is a bolt in the shape of the letter U with screw threads on both ends.

U-bolts have primarily been used to support pipework, pipes through which fluids and gasses pass. As such, U-bolts were measured using pipe-work engineering speak.  A U-bolt would be described by the size of pipe it was supporting. U-bolts are also used to hold ropes together. 

For example, a 40 Nominal Bore U-bolt would be asked for by pipe work engineers, and only they would know what that meant. In reality, the 40 nominal bore part bears little resemblance to the size and dimensions of the U-bolt.

The nominal bore of a pipe is actually a measurement of the inside diameter of the pipe. Engineers are interested in this because they design a pipe by the amount of fluid / gas it can transport.

As U-bolts are now being used by a much wider audience to clamp any kind of tubing / round bar, then a more convenient measurement system needs to be used.

Four elements uniquely define any U-bolt:

 Material type (for example: bright zinc-plated mild steel)
 Thread dimensions (for example: M12 * 50 mm)
 Inside diameter (for example: 50 mm - the distance between the legs)
 Inside height (for example: 120 mm)

References

Threaded fasteners